KBLU-LP (92.3 FM, "Aggie Radio") is a student-run radio station licensed to serve the community of Logan, Utah. The station is owned by Utah State University, through licensee Aggie Radio, and airs a freeform radio format.

The station was assigned the KBLU-LP call letters by the Federal Communications Commission on March 12, 2015.

References

External links
 Official Website
 FCC Public Inspection File for KBLU-LP
 

BLU-LP
BLU-LP
Radio stations established in 2017
2017 establishments in Utah
Utah State University
BLU-LP
Freeform radio stations
Cache County, Utah